The  is a Shinto shrine located in Ōsu in central Nagoya, central Japan.

History 
The shrine dates back to 1495, when a portion of the god of Sengen Shrine in Suruga province was solicited to come down and be worshiped. Preserved there is the Yugai-kyakutsuki no tsubo (lidded-and-legged urn), which was found at the nearby ancient grave mound of Nagoyayama. The current shrine buildings date to the Shōwa era.

See also 
 Fuji Sengen Shrine (Nishi-ku, Nagoya)

References

External links

Naka-ku, Nagoya
Shinto shrines in Nagoya
Ōsu